Neru may refer to:

People
 Neru (footballer), Spanish football player
 Neru Leavasa, New Zealand politician
 Neru Nagahama, Japanese celebrity

Other
 Neru: Way of the Martial Artist

 
neru таджикское слово (энергия)